Gang is a collaborative mixtape between Headie One and Fred Again. It was released on 3 April 2020 through Relentless Records. The album features several other United Kingdom-based artists, Jamie xx, FKA Twigs, and Sampha are all named features, while Slowthai is sampled.

Track listing

Charts

References

2020 mixtape albums
Fred Again albums
Headie One albums
Collaborative albums
Drill music albums